Omund Bjørnsen Birkeland (30 April 1786 – 14 April 1862) was a Norwegian farmer and soldier. He served as a representative at the Norwegian Constitutional Assembly at Eidsvoll in 1814. 

Omund Bjørnsen Birkeland was born on the Birkeland farm in the parish of Undal near the village of Konsmo in Audnedal in Vest-Agder, Norway. He took over the farm from his father in 1808, at a time he was in military service. He served with the Vesterlenske Infantry Regiment (Vesterlenske infanteriregiment) which was a division in the Norwegian Army. The soldiers within the unit were recruited from Telemark, Aust-Agder and Rogaland as well as from Vest-Agder. He was married to Asbør Torgiusdotter and the couple had three children.

He represented Vesterlenske infanteriregiment at the Norwegian Constituent Assembly in 1814, together with Major Just Henrik Ely.
At the Assembly, he supported the position of the union party (Unionspartiet).

References

External links
Representantene på Eidsvoll 1814 (Cappelen Damm AS)
 Men of Eidsvoll (eidsvollsmenn)

Related Reading
Holme Jørn (2014) De kom fra alle kanter - Eidsvollsmennene og deres hus  (Oslo: Cappelen Damm) 

1786 births
1862 deaths
People from Vest-Agder
Norwegian farmers
Norwegian Army personnel
Norwegian military personnel of the Napoleonic Wars
Fathers of the Constitution of Norway